Dongmenkou Station, or Dongmenkou (Tianyi Square) Station, or literally East Gate Station, is a metro station on Line 1 of the Ningbo Rail Transit that started operations on 30May 2014. It is situated under Zhongshan East Road in Haishu District of Ningbo City, Zhejiang Province, eastern China.

Exits

Connections

Ningbo Bus Network

Dongmenkou Bus Stop (Westbound): 2, 2-Night, 15, 19, 360, 503, 506, 515, 517, 518, 821, 852 (All-Night), 871 (Night), 891 (Night)

Dongmenkou Bus Stop (Eastbound): 2, 2-Night, 4, 10, 15, 19, 350, 360, 503, 506, 515, 517, 518, 821, 855 (Night), 871 (Night), 891 (Night)

Heyi Avenue Bus Stop: Routes 28, 60, 331, 350

Station layout

Notable places nearby
Tianyi Square, Xinhualian Mall, Heyi Avenue Shopping Center, Ningbo Movie City, Qianye Hall, Jiangxia Park.

References

Railway stations in Zhejiang
Railway stations in China opened in 2014
Ningbo Rail Transit stations